

What is a Course? 
In higher education a course is a unit of teaching  that typically lasts one academic term, is led by one or more instructors, and has a fixed roster of students. A course usually covers an individual subject. Courses generally have a fixed program of sessions every week during the term, called lessons or classes.
Course may refer to:

Directions or navigation
 Course (navigation), the path of travel
 Course (orienteering), a series of control points visited by orienteers during a competition, marked with red/white flags in the terrain, and corresponding purple symbols on the map

Education
 Course (education), a unit of instruction in one subject, lasting one academic term
 Course of study, or academic major, a programme of education leading to a degree or diploma

Food
 Course (food), a set of one or more food items served at once during a meal. The main ingredient is often meat or fish. It most often follows an appetizer, soup, or salad.
 Main course, the primary dish in a meal consisting of several courses.

Sports
 Courses and rules, in show jumpting, an equitation or equestrian obstacle course
 Coursing, the pursuit of game or other animals by dogs
 Golf course, an area of land designated for the play of golf 
 La Course by Le Tour de France ("La Course"), a women's professional road course bicycle race that accompanies Le Tour (Tour de France)
 Obstacle course, a series of challenging physical obstacles an individual or team must navigate for sport
 Race course, for the racing of people, animals, and vehicles

Other uses
 Course (architecture), a continuous horizontal layer of similarly sized building material, in a wall
 Course (medicine), a regime of medical drugs, or the speed of evolution of a disease
 Course (music), a pair or more of adjacent strings tuned to unison or an octave and played together to give a single note, in a stringed instrument
 Course (sail), the principal sail on a mast of a sailing vessel
 String course, a continuous narrow horizontal course or moulding which projects slightly from the surface of a wall
 The Course, a Dutch dance music group
 Watercourse, the channel that a flowing body of water follows

See also 
 Coarse (disambiguation) 
 Courser (horse)
 Courser

diapper